Cash and Curry is a 2008 British independent comedy film directed by Sarjit Bains and written by Christine Edwards and Manish Patel. It was filmed in December 2006 on location in Harrow, Barnet and Wembley. The film has been premiered at the Portobello Film Festival, Mumbai Film Festival and the Tongues on Fire Film Festival. At the Portobello Film Festival it received the Special Audience Award for Best Feature Film. It was released on DVD in UK and Ireland by 4 Digital Media on 19 July 2010.

Cast
Ameet Chana as Raj
Pooja Shah as Gauri
Ronny Jhutti as Rohit
Manish Patel as Gabbar
Faria Alam as Lakshmi
Sofia Hayat as Dharmi
Shaana Diya as Khusmi
Laurence Stevenson as Isaac
Peter Peralta as Tony
Lee Latchford Evans as Casper Warrington-Boothe
Makosi Musambasi as Ayesha
Kinga Karolczak as Minjeeta
Dominique Gozdawa as Anna
Brian Jackson as Brian
Alex Liang as Taz
Andrew Harrison as Tiny
Sui-Lie 'Jay' Cheung as Micky
Den Sen 'Sky' Hau as Ricky
Jose Cuenco Jr. as Ali
Silas Hawkins as Foodie Husband
Jamie Bannerman as Tarquin the Skinhead

References

External links

2008 films
2000s crime comedy films
British crime comedy films
British Indian films
British independent films
Films set in London
Films shot in London
2008 comedy films
2000s English-language films
2000s British films